Bob Cowley Riley (September 18, 1924 – February 16, 1994) was an American educator and politician who served as acting governor of Arkansas for 11 days in 1975. He had previously been a member of the Arkansas House of Representatives from 1947 to 1951, Mayor of Arkadelphia, Arkansas in 1966 and 1967, as well as the 12th Lieutenant Governor of Arkansas from 1971 to 1975. Riley wore a black eyepatch because of an injury sustained in World War II.

Life and career
Riley was born in Little Rock, the son of Columbus Allen Riley and the former Winnie Mae Craig. He attended public schools in Little Rock. He dropped out of high school after Pearl Harbor to enlist in the United States Marine Corps. On July 24, 1944, Riley, based in Guam, led a rifle squad assault against a Japanese machine gun emplacement. The attack nearly cost Riley his life. His severe wounds kept him hospitalized for more than a year. Not only was his vision impaired, his limbs were battered and he was in pain thereafter. His left eye was removed; although he had some perception of light in his right eye for a time, it quickly faded and he became completely blind.

After World War II service, Riley graduated with bachelor's and master's degrees from the University of Arkansas at Fayetteville in 1950 and 1951, respectively.

Riley served as a member of the Arkansas House of Representatives from Pulaski County (Little Rock) from 1947 to 1951 even though he was in Washington County at the university for the majority of the time during his legislative tenure. In 1950, he failed in a bid for the Arkansas Senate. For a while, he was an insurance salesman.

Riley taught at Little Rock University from 1951 to 1955, and received his doctorate in education from the University of Arkansas in 1957.

He then took a post at Ouachita Baptist University at Arkadelphia in Clark County. He became the longtime chairman of the political science department and also taught history and economics. His OBU colleagues were Jim McDougal and Jim Ranchino, both advocates of Bill Clinton's beginning political career. Riley served on the Arkadelphia City Council from 1960 to 1966 and as mayor in 1966 and 1967.

He served as Lieutenant Governor of Arkansas from 1971 to 1975.  In 1970, as the running mate of Dale Leon Bumpers, Riley defeated Republican Sterling R. Cockrill of Little Rock, the ticket-mate of Governor Winthrop Rockefeller, whom Bumpers crushed in the general election. Riley defeated Cockrill, 334,379 (56.5 percent) to Cockrill's 232,429 (39.3 percent). The remaining 4.2 percent went to Hubert Blanton of Hughes in St. Francis County in eastern Arkansas, nominee of the American Independent Party. Riley won sixty-six of the seventy-five counties.

In 1972, again on the Bumpers gubernatorial slate, Riley defeated the Republican Ken Coon, then of Fort Smith, the seat of Sebastian County. Riley topped Coon, 392,869 (62.8 percent) to 233,090 (37.2 percent) and won majorities in seventy-two counties.

In 1974, Riley was an unsuccessful gubernatorial candidate. He and former Governor Orval Faubus were defeated in the Democratic primary by former U.S. Representative David Pryor of Camden. Pryor went on to defeat Coon, Riley's former opponent for lieutenant governor, in the 1974 general election.

Riley became Acting Governor of Arkansas in 1975 to serve the final days of the unexpired term of then Governor Dale Bumpers. Bumpers had been elected to the United States Senate and his Senate term began before his term as governor expired. Riley served as Acting Governor for eleven days.

He taught at OBU until 1980, when health problems forced his premature retirement. He died of congestive heart failure. Riley and his wife, the former Claudia Zimmerman, were the parents of one daughter, Megen (born 1959).

Riley is interred in Rest Haven Memorial Gardens in Arkadelphia. His widow, Claudia Zimmerman Riley, who served as the First Lady of Arkansas for 11 days, died on September 14, 2015.

See also
List of governors of Arkansas

References

External links
Encyclopedia of Arkansas History & Culture biography

1924 births
1994 deaths
20th-century American politicians
Acting Governors of Arkansas
United States Marine Corps personnel of World War II
American politicians with disabilities
Arkansas city council members
American blind people
Blind politicians
Democratic Party governors of Arkansas
Lieutenant Governors of Arkansas
Mayors of places in Arkansas
Democratic Party members of the Arkansas House of Representatives
People from Arkadelphia, Arkansas
Politicians from Little Rock, Arkansas
University of Arkansas people
United States Marines